Yamon Figurs (born January 10, 1983) is a former gridiron football wide receiver and return specialist. He was drafted by the Baltimore Ravens in the third round of the 2007 NFL Draft. He played college football at Kansas State.

Figurs was also a member of the Detroit Lions, Tampa Bay Buccaneers, Oakland Raiders, Cleveland Browns, Tennessee Titans, Edmonton Eskimos and Saskatchewan Roughriders.

Early years
Figurs played high school football at Westwood High School in Fort Pierce, Florida. While there he was a three-year starter and earned All-Conference and All-Area honors as a senior. He also lettered in track and field and basketball.

College career
Figurs played college football at Kansas State. During his senior year, he earned first-team All-Big 12 honors as a return specialist. He finished his career with 73 receptions for 1,144 yards, and 2,275 all-purpose yards. In 2006, he received a bachelor's degree in social science.

Professional career

2007 NFL Combine

Baltimore Ravens
Figurs was drafted by the Baltimore Ravens in the third round of the 2007 NFL Draft. During his rookie season, he was the Ravens main kick and punt returner after their starting kick returner B. J. Sams suffered a torn Anterior cruciate ligament on September 10, 2007. He finished the season with one returned kick for a touchdown, one punt return for a touchdown, and one catch for 36 yards.

During the 2008 season, safety Jim Leonhard took over the main return duties. And again Figurs only recorded one catch; however, it was a 43-yard touchdown.

He stayed with the Ravens through the 2009 preseason but failed to make final cuts as he was waived on September 5.

Detroit Lions
Figurs was claimed off waivers by the Detroit Lions on September 6, 2009. He was waived on September 30.

Tampa Bay Buccaneers
Figurs was signed by the Tampa Bay Buccaneers on October 13. He was waived on December 22 when the team re-signed wide receiver Micheal Spurlock.

Oakland Raiders
Figurs signed a future contract with the Oakland Raiders on January 13, 2010. He was cut on September 15, 2010, due in part to a fumble. He caught two passes while on the roster.

Cleveland Browns
On October 20, 2010 Figurs signed a contract with the Cleveland Browns to replace injured receivers Josh Cribbs and Mohamed Massaquoi. He was waived on October 26. His only statistic occurred when he lost four yards on a handoff.

Tennessee Titans
On January 13, 2011 Figurs signed a future contract with the Tennessee Titans, but was waived on September 2.

Edmonton Eskimos

On April 16, 2012 Figurs signed with the Edmonton Eskimos of the Canadian Football League.  He was released on June 23, 2012.

Saskatchewan Roughriders
Figurs left the 2013 Saskatchewan Roughriders training camp after realizing he wasn't going to make the team.

References

External links
Detroit Lions bio
Kansas State Wildcats bio
Tampa Bay Buccaneers bio
Edmonton Eskimos bio

1983 births
Living people
People from Fort Pierce, Florida
American football return specialists
American football wide receivers
Canadian football wide receivers
American players of Canadian football
Baltimore Ravens players
Cleveland Browns players
Detroit Lions players
Edmonton Elks players
Kansas State Wildcats football players
Oakland Raiders players
Players of American football from Florida
Saskatchewan Roughriders players
Tampa Bay Buccaneers players